is a railway station on the Ōu Main Line and Gonō Line in the village of Inakadate, Aomori Prefecture, Japan, operated by East Japan Railway Company (JR East).

Lines
It is also the northern terminal station for the Gonō Line.

Station layout

Kawabe Station has two ground level island platforms, serving three tracks, connected to the station building by a footbridge. The station will be unmanned from March 18, 2023. A fourth track has not been in use since April 1, 1998 with the discontinuation of the Kuroishi Line.

Platforms

History
Kawabe Station opened on December 1, 1894 as a station on the Japanese Government Railways, the predecessor to the Japanese National Railways (JNR) on the Ōu Northern Line. From August 15, 1912, a spur line opened to Kuroishi, and from September 25, 1918, the Mutsu Railway (present-day Gonō Line) began operations from Kawabe Station. On November 1, 1984, operations on the Kuroishi Line were transferred from JNR to the Konan Railway. All freight operations were discontinued from April 1987. With the privatization of JNR on April 1, 1987, it came under the operational control of JR East. The Kuroishi Line ceased operations from April 1, 1998.

Passenger statistics
In fiscal 2018, the station was used by an average of 285 passengers daily (boarding passengers only).

Surrounding area
Kawabe-Izumi Post office

Bus services
Kōnan Bus services for Kuroishi Station via Maeda-Yashiki.

See also
 List of railway stations in Japan

References

External links

   

Stations of East Japan Railway Company
Railway stations in Japan opened in 1894
Railway stations in Aomori Prefecture
Inakadate, Aomori
Ōu Main Line
Gonō Line